Nicolai Costenco (December 21, 1913, Chişinău - July 29, 1993, Chişinău) was a writer from Moldova. He was managing editor of Viaţa Basarabiei (1934–1940) and was deported to Siberia în 1941.

Biography
Nicolai Costenco was born in Chişinău on December 21, 1913, but his maternal grandparents, Gheorghe and Libeada, brought him up in Cihoreni. He worked for Viaţa Basarabiei (1934–1940). In 1941 he was deported to Siberia because he claimed that there is no difference between the Moldovan language and the Romanian language. In his poem, "Pictează-mi o mirişte", Grigore Vieru wrote: "Nicolai Costenco, poetul/ Care şi-a scris poemele/ Pe caietul de gheaţă Siberian"...

Awards
 Premiul de Stat al Republicii Moldova (1988).

Works
 Poezii (1937),
 Ore (1939),
 Cleopatra (1939).
 Severograd, 1963,
 Norocul omului, 1965),
 Serghei Lazo, 1967),
 Poezii alese (1957),
 Poezii noi (1960),
 Versuri (1963),
 Mugur, mugurel (1967),
 Poezii si poeme (1969),
 Poezii si poeme (1983),
 Euritmii (1990),
 Elegii pagane (1998).

Bibliography
 Timpul de dimineaţă, Un scriitor al rezistenţei şi al continuităţii: Nicolai Costenco (1913–1993), 2004. – 5 ian.
 Mihai Cimpoi, "Alte disocieri", Chapter Nicolai Costenco, Chişinău, Ed. Cartea moldoveneasca, 1971.
 Vasile Badiu, Eroul traditional in ipostaze noi. In cartea: Eroul con temporan in literatura moldoveneasca, Chişinău, Ed. Stiinta, 1972.
 Mihail Dolgan, Sunt cetatean al tarii poeziei. In cartea lui: Crez si maiestrie artistica, Chişinău, Ed. Cartea moldoveneasca, 1982; Lirica din perioada exilului siberian. In Literatura si arta, 1995, 26 ianuarie.
 Ion Ciocanu, Cetatean al tarii poeziei. In cartea: Nicolai Costenco, Euritmii, Chişinău, Ed. Hyperion, 1990.
 George Calinescu, Istoria literaturii romane de la origini pana in prezent, p. 1031.
 Grigore Vieru, "PICTEAZA-MI O MIRISTE" ("Nicolai Costenco, poetul/ Care şi-a scris poemele/ Pe caietul de gheaţă Siberian")

References

External links 
 NICOLAI F. COSTENCO, EXILATUL DEDUBLAT
 Revista Timpul, Nicolai Costenco 90, Un scriitor al rezistenţei şi al continuităţii
 Referat Nicolai Costenco

1913 births
1993 deaths
Writers from Chișinău
People from Kishinyovsky Uyezd
Moldovan male writers
Romanian activists
Moldovan activists
20th-century Romanian male writers
Soviet writers